Stateline Township is one of the thirteen townships of Sherman County, Kansas, United States.  The population was 344 at the 2000 census.

Geography
Located in the western part of the county, along the Colorado border, Stateline borders the following townships:
Grant Township — north
Lincoln Township — east
McPherson Township — south
Kit Carson County lies across the Colorado border to the west.

It lies west of the county seat of Goodland. The city of Kanorado is located in the western part of the township, on the Colorado state line.  As of 2000, 248 of the township's residents lived in Kanorado; the rest of the township had 96 residents.

Several intermittent headwaters of Beaver Creek, a tributary of the Republican River, flow through Stateline Township.

Transportation
Interstate 70 and U.S. Route 24 travel east–west through Stateline Township, and the short K-267 connects Kanorado with Interstate 70.  A small airport, Hall Farms Airport, is located in the southern part of the township.  A railroad line also travels east–west through Stateline Township, just north of the interstate.

Government
As an active township, Stateline Township is governed by a three-member board, composed of the township trustee, the township treasurer, and the township clerk.  The trustee acts as the township executive.

References

External links
 County website

Townships in Sherman County, Kansas
Townships in Kansas